Kathryn M. Abel FRCP FRCPsych is the NIHR National Lead for Mental Health Lead. She is an internationally recognised British psychiatrist specialising clinically in resistant schizophrenia and gender-specified service developments. She is a clinical academic, professor of Psychological Medicine and Director of both the Centre for Women's Mental Health and the GM.Digital (formally CAMHS.Digital) Research Unit at the University of Manchester.

She is a European Research Council Fellow and National Institutes of Health Research Senior Investigator and a former member of the Academic Faculty Executive at the Royal College of Psychiatrists. She also served as a member of the NICE Appraisal Committee C between 2008 and 2018.

Her research focusses on maternal condition, maternal early environment and how it influences brain development and later cognitive ability of offspring. She highlights sex differences and gender-specific approaches in research and in service development. She uses large, high quality population data in the UK, Scandinavia and Western Australia for epidemiological studies of maternal exposures and offspring outcomes. She also uses functional imaging in mothers to understand maternal brain and how it relates to maternal sensitivity to infants. More recently, she has developed paradigms for scanning infant brain as a way of examining the effects of maternal exposures on infant development. She has led a number of influential studies published in the Lancet on the population mental health effects of the COVID-19 pandemic.

She is currently collaborating with the Lata Medical Research Foundation in Nagpur, India to support development of screening and prevention of common mental disorders in women and girls in rural villages.

She is co-editor of a number of textbooks including 'The Female Mind' (RCPSYH 2017) and Comprehensive Women's Mental Health (Cambridge 2016).

References 

British psychiatrists
Living people
Academics of the University of Manchester
Fellows of the Royal College of Psychiatrists
Fellows of the Royal College of Physicians
Year of birth missing (living people)